Alan Michael Forney (born June 28, 1960) is an American former competitive rower and Olympic silver medalist.

Career
At the 1984 Summer Olympics, Forney finished in 2nd place in the men's coxless four competition with David Clark, Jonathan Smith, and Phillip Stekl.

References

External links
 
 

1960 births
Living people
Rowers at the 1984 Summer Olympics
Olympic silver medalists for the United States in rowing
American male rowers
Medalists at the 1984 Summer Olympics